Wolfgang Amadeus Mozart's Flute Quartet No. 3 in C major, K. Anh. 171/285b, is the last of three quartets for the amateur flautist Ferdinand De Jean. Mozart's manuscript designates this work for flute, violin, viola and cello. Despite following directly after the first two flute quartets in the Köchel catalogue, the Quartet in C was almost certainly written a few years later, likely sometime between the years 1781 to 1782.

The quartet is in two movements:
Allegro, 3/4
Andantino, Theme and variations

The second movement was adapted by Mozart from the sixth movement of his Serenade No. 10 in B flat major (K. 361).

A typical performance lasts roughly 15½ minutes.

External links
 
 

Chamber music by Wolfgang Amadeus Mozart
Compositions in C major
1782 compositions